This is a list of the stations and halts on the Welsh Highland Railway

Original 

Bettws Garmon
Salem Halt

Hafod Ruffydd Halt

Hafod Garregog Halt
Croesor Junction
Ynysfor Halt
Pont Croesor Halt
Portmadoc New (1933) station
Portmadoc New (1923) station

Restored Welsh Highland Railway / Rheilffordd Eyri

Welsh Highland Heritage Railway 

Gelert's Farm halt

References

Further reading 

Welsh Highland Railway